Abraham Hinckelmann (2 May 1652, Döbeln, Electorate of Saxony – 11 February 1695), a German Protestant theologian, was an Islamologist who was one of the first to print a complete Qur'an in Hamburg.

Later, a cleric named Ludovico Marracci from the "Society of the Monks of the Divine Path" published a better version.

External links
https://web.archive.org/web/20080112001936/http://www.msgr.ca/msgr-2/Koran%20-%20Nativity%20-%2002.htm
https://web.archive.org/web/20070929155310/http://www.quran.org.uk/articles/ieb_quran_in_the_west.htm
 Achim Rohde:  A Hamburg Koran and the Downgrading of the Hebraic in the Christian Theology of the 17th Century]. In: Key Documents of German-Jewish History, October 21, 2018. 

1652 births
1695 deaths
People from Döbeln
17th-century German Protestant theologians
People from the Electorate of Saxony
Martin Luther University of Halle-Wittenberg alumni
German scholars
German male non-fiction writers
17th-century German writers
17th-century German male writers